The Women in League is an Australian rugby league charity which was founded in 2007 to celebrates and acknowledges the role women play at all levels and in all areas of the Rugby League.

History

See also

Men of League Foundation
Women's rugby league

References

https://en.m.wikipedia.org/wiki/Australia_women%27s_national_rugby_sevens_team

External links

National Rugby League
Women's rugby league in Australia
Charities based in Australia
2007 establishments in Australia
Sports organizations established in 2007
Rugby league organisations
Women's sports organizations
Sports charities